| past_members    =

Keiino (often stylised as KEiiNO) is a Norwegian supergroup consisting of Sámi rapper Fred Buljo and singers Alexandra Rotan and Tom Hugo. The group was created in late 2018 in preparation for the participation in Melodi Grand Prix 2019, which they won and so were selected to represent Norway in the Eurovision Song Contest 2019, coming in 6th place in the final.

Background and career
The group was established in the late summer of 2018 when Tom Hugo and his husband, Alex Olsson, began writing "Spirit in the Sky", a song inspired by historical struggles for equality. They later joined Sámi rapper and joiker Fred-René Buljo and singer Alexandra Rotan. The group name Keiino was inspired by the name of Buljo's home town Kautokeino. The last part  translates to the 'way' or 'road', which Buljo said "represents the road that brought us together" in an interview with TV 2. In an interview with the Kven-minority-centered media Ruijan Kaiku, Fred Buljo discussed his Kven/Finnish ancestry, and that they had worked with a Finnish producer, and thus landed on the name , the Kven variant of North Sami  'way'. Alexandra Rotan explained that they each had their own career before Keiino, but it was Keiino that showed them the way to success.

As a result of winning Melodi Grand Prix 2019, the group represented Norway in the Eurovision Song Contest 2019 with the song "Spirit in the Sky". In the second semi-final held on 16 May 2019, they qualified to the final. At the finals, their entry received the highest points from the televoting with a total of 291 points, although combined with their lesser score from the jury groups they finished in sixth place, with 331 points.

On 8 May 2020, the group released their debut studio album, Okta. The album peaked at number 30 on the Norwegian chart. Okta was re-issued twice, first as a Norway-only deluxe CD in October 2021, and later as Okta (Guokte) on 24 February 2022.

On 11 January 2021, it was announced that KEiiNO would participate in the Melodi Grand Prix 2021 final with the pre-qualified song "Monument". The song was released at midnight on 15 January 2021 with the group's debut performance of the song during the first heat of Melodi Grand Prix 2021 on 16 January 2021. The song reached the top 4 in the final on 20 February 2021, eventually reaching the gold duel, but lost to Tix, who represented Norway in the Eurovision Song Contest 2021 with the song "Fallen Angel" and placed in 18th in the final with 75 points.

Keiino embarked on an Australian tour in early 2022, which included performances at the Australian national final and the Sydney Gay and Lesbian Mardi Gras. During the tour, Rotan was admitted to hospital due to an infected koala scratch.

Discography

Albums

Singles

References

Notes

References

External links

Norwegian musical groups
Eurovision Song Contest entrants for Norway
Eurovision Song Contest entrants of 2019
Melodi Grand Prix contestants
Melodi Grand Prix winners